This is a list of horror films released in 2010.

References

Lists of horror films by year
2010-related lists